Lewisham is a district of London, England

Lewisham could also refer to:

London Borough of Lewisham
Metropolitan Borough of Lewisham, former local government district, 1900—1965
Lewisham District (Metropolis), former local government district, 1855—1900
Lewisham, New South Wales, a suburb of Sydney, Australia
Lewisham, Tasmania, a locality in Tasmania, Australia
The Battle of Lewisham, a conflict involving the far-right National Front and counter-demonstrators.

See also
Love and Mr. Lewisham, by H. G. Wells.